Albert-Léon Lebarque (18 November 1853 – 1939) was a French sculptor. His work was part of the sculpture event in the art competition at the 1928 Summer Olympics.

References

1853 births
1939 deaths
20th-century French sculptors
French male sculptors
Olympic competitors in art competitions
People from Ardennes (department)